Guilherme Mendes Godoy (born 1988 in Rio Claro, São Paulo, Brazil) is a four-time Brazilian Jiu-Jitsu (BJJ) world champion at the black belt level. Guilherme along with his brother Rafael Mendes are 3rd degree black belts under Ramon Lemos, and competitors for the Art of Jiu Jitsu team.

Biography
Guilherme was born in Rio Claro, Brazil. Along with his brother Rafael, he started training Jiu-Jitsu through an older cousin named Thiago Mendes, who at the time was a purple belt under Leonardo Santos. After only a few months of training Thiago recognized great potential for the two boys and took them to train with Ramon Lemos and his own teacher. "Gui", as he is often called, is one of the main figures in the Atos Jiu Jitsu team, being also one of the best “peso pluma” (64,00 kg / 141.5 lb) competitors to have ever competed in the sport. As well as being the first Atos team member to achieve a gold medal at the International Brazilian Jiu Jitsu Federation (IBJJF) World Championship in 2009. Guilherme Mendes is also the co-founder of the Art of Jiu-Jitsu academy along with his younger brother Rafael Mendes.

Art of Jiu Jitsu Academy
After teaching many seminars, the Mendes brothers decided that they wanted to have a traditional Jiu-Jitsu school with their own students. In July 2012, with the help of their long time sponsor and RVCA founder, Pat Tenore, Guilherme and Rafael Mendes opened up The Art of Jiu Jitsu Academy in Costa Mesa, California. On October 6, 2020, the Art of Jiu Jitsu's famous kid's program produced its first black belt, eighteen-year-old Jessa Khan followed that same month by Tainan Dalpra.

References

External links

Art of Jiu Jitsu Academy official website

1989 births
Living people
People from Rio Claro, São Paulo
Brazilian practitioners of Brazilian jiu-jitsu
People awarded a black belt in Brazilian jiu-jitsu
Sportspeople from São Paulo (state)